Natasha Jane Flint (born 2 August 1996) is an English footballer who plays as a forward for Leicester City. She has represented England at the youth levels, playing at the 2014 FIFA U-20 Women's World Cup, as well as the UEFA Women's Under-19 Championship in 2015, 2014 and 2013, collecting a runners-up medal in 2013. She played as a teenager for Manchester City, with whom she won the FA Women's League Cup in 2014.

Youth career
Born in the Lower Kersal area of Salford in Greater Manchester, Flint joined the Manchester United Centre of Excellence at age five. In 2013, she joined the Manchester City academy and by the following year, she was training with and traveling to camp with the senior team.

Senior career

Manchester City
In March 2014, at age 17, Flint signed her first senior contract with Manchester City ahead of the club's first campaign in the Women's Super League. In July 2014, she scored a goal against Chelsea that was named a finalist for the 2014 FA WSL Goal of the Season, and in October, she was in the starting lineup when City won the 2014 Continental Cup (WSL Cup).  However, a In October 2015, following a 2015 campaign with just one start and five substitute appearances in the 2015 FA WSL, Flint was released by Manchester City at age 19.

2015–17
Following her release from Manchester City, Flint signed with Preston North End (later renamed Fylde Ladies) in the FA Women's National League North, the third tier of English women's football in October 2015 and played the remainder of the year before signing with Notts County in the Super League. However, she left Notts County in March 2016, four days before the start of the 2016 FA WSL season citing "personal reasons" and signed with the renamed Fylde Ladies in June 2016. In January 2017, she signed with Sheffield F.C. in WSL 2 (now FA Women's Championship) before rejoining Fylde in July the same year.

Blackburn Rovers
In December 2017, Flint signed with Blackburn Rovers in the FA Women's National League, the third tier of women's football in England. In 2019, Flint helped Blackburn achieve their first-ever promotion to the FA Women's Championship and scored in the playoff final against Coventry United. Although she was limited to six games and nine goals in the 2019–20 campaign curtailed by the COVID-19 pandemic, she had amassed 70 goals in 66 matches over three seasons.

Leicester City
In June 2020, Flint left Blackburn at the conclusion of her contract and in August 2020, she signed with Leicester City Women, along with eleven other new players who were brought in as part of the women's club's conversion to a fully professional structure. She won the Women's Championship Player of the Month honours for December 2020 with four league goals during the month. On 4 April 2021, Flint scored the second Leicester goal in a 2–0 win over London City Lionesses, securing the 2020–21 season title and a promotion to the FA Women's Super League. Flint had previously worked part-time as a lab technician, but after losing the job to a COVID-19 pandemic-forced furlough, she moved to training full-time, a change that she has credited for her scoring form with Leicester.

She ended the 2020–21 Championship season as the club's top scorer with 17 goals in the competition. On 16 May 2021, Flint scored the winning goal in a 2–3 upset of Manchester United in the fifth round of the 2020–21 Women's FA Cup.

International career
Flint has represented England at youth levels and played at the 2013 UEFA Women's Under-19 Championship, where England under-19s reached the final, as well as the 2014 and the 2015 editions of the tournament, scoring a 40-yard goal against Spain in the latter. She also played for 
England under-20s at the 2014 FIFA U-20 Women's World Cup.

References

External links

Leicester City W.F.C. profile

1996 births
Living people
English women's footballers
Women's association football forwards
Footballers from Salford
Notts County L.F.C. players
Manchester City W.F.C. players
Fylde Ladies F.C. players
Sheffield F.C. Ladies players
Blackburn Rovers L.F.C. players
Leicester City W.F.C. players
Women's Super League players
Women's Championship (England) players